Adam Huss (born March 1, 1977) is an American television and film actor, producer and writer. Huss is best known for his role as Josh Kantos in the Starz TV series Power and as Lance on The Bold and the Beautiful. He was also an on-air radio personality "Big City Kid" or "BCK" on Radio Disney affiliate.

Biography
Huss is from Long Island and graduated with a BA in Drama from Binghamton University. He married his boyfriend, fellow actor Adam Bucci, on July 25, 2019.

Filmography

Movies

Television

References

External links

Living people
1977 births
American male television actors
American male film actors
American film producers
American male writers
American gay actors
Actors from New York (state)
People from Long Island
American people of Italian descent
Binghamton University alumni
21st-century LGBT people